Push Push may refer to:

 Push Push (album) or the title song, by Herbie Mann, 1971
 Push Push (band), a New Zealand rock band
 Push! Push! (film), a 1997 South Korean film

Songs
 "Push Push" (Kat Deluna song), 2010
 "Push! Push!" (song), by Falco, 1999
 "Push Push", by Black Uhuru from Sinsemilla, 1981
 "Push Push", by Brick, 1979
 "Push Push", by Cinderella from Night Songs, 1986
 "Push Push", by Ted Taylor (as Austin Taylor), 1960
 "Push Push (Lady Lightning)", by Bang Camaro from Bang Camaro
 "Push Push", a song by Sistar from their 2010 album So Cool

See also 
 Push (disambiguation)